An ovarian follicle is a roughly spheroid cellular aggregation set found in the ovaries. It secretes hormones that influence stages of the menstrual cycle. At the time of puberty, women have approximately 200,000 to 300,000 follicles, each with the potential to release an egg cell (ovum) at ovulation for fertilization. These eggs are developed once every menstrual cycle with around 450–500 being ovulated during a woman's reproductive lifetime.

Structure 

Ovarian follicles are the basic units of female reproductive biology. Each of them contains a single oocyte (immature ovum or egg cell). These structures are periodically initiated to grow and develop, culminating in ovulation of usually a single competent oocyte in humans. They also consist of granulosa cells and theca of follicle.

Oocyte

Once a month, one of the ovaries releases a mature egg (ovum), known as an oocyte. The nucleus of such an oocyte is called a germinal vesicle (see picture).

Cumulus oophorus

Cumulus oophorus is a cluster of cells (called cumulus cells) that surround the oocyte both in the ovarian follicle and after ovulation.

Membrana granulosa

It contains numerous granulosa cells.

Granulosa cell
Granulosa cells or follicular cells are cells that surround the oocyte within the follicle; their numbers increase directly in response to heightened levels of circulating gonadotropins or decrease in response to testosterone. They also produce peptides involved in ovarian hormone synthesis regulation. Follicle-stimulating hormone (FSH) induces granulosa cells to express luteinizing hormone (LH) receptors on their surfaces; when circulating LH binds to these receptors, proliferation stops.

Theca of follicle

The granulosa cells, in turn, are enclosed in a thin layer of extracellular matrix – the follicular basement membrane or basal lamina (fibro-vascular coat in picture). Outside the basal lamina, the layers theca interna and theca externa are found.

Development

Primordial follicles are indiscernible to the naked eye. However, these eventually develop into primary, secondary and tertiary vesicular follicles. Tertiary vesicular follicles (also called "mature vesicular follicles" or "ripe vesicular follicles") are sometimes called Graafian follicles (after Regnier de Graaf).

In humans, oocytes are established in the ovary before birth and may lie dormant awaiting initiation for up to 50 years.

After rupturing, the follicle is turned into a corpus luteum.

Development of oocytes in ovarian follicles

In a larger perspective, the whole folliculogenesis from primordial to preovulatory follicle is located in the stage of meiosis I of ootidogenesis in oogenesis.

Embryonic development in males and females follows a common pathway before gametogenesis. Once gametogonia enter the gonadal ridge, however, they attempt to associate with these somatic cells. Development proceeds and the gametogonia turn into oogonia, which become fully surrounded by a layer of cells (pre-granulosa cells).

The oogonia multiply by dividing mitotically; this proliferation ends when the oogonia enter meiosis. The amount of time that oogonia multiply by mitosis is not species specific. In the human fetus, cells undergoing mitosis are seen until the second and third trimester of pregnancy. After beginning the meiotic process, the oogonia (now called primary oocytes) can no longer replicate. Therefore, the total number of gametes is established at this time. Once the primary oocytes stop dividing the cells enter a prolonged 'resting phase'. This 'resting phase' or dictyate stage can last anywhere up to fifty years in the human.

For several primary oocytes that complete meiosis I each month, only one or a few functional oocyte, the dominant follicles, completes maturation and undergoes ovulation. The other follicles that begin to mature will regress and become atretic follicles, eventually deteriorating.

The primary oocyte turns into a secondary oocyte in mature ovarian follicles. Unlike the sperm, the egg is arrested in the secondary stage of meiosis until fertilization.

Upon fertilization by sperm, the secondary oocyte continues the second part of meiosis and becomes a zygote.

Clinical significance

Any ovarian follicle that is larger than about three centimeters is termed an ovarian cyst.

Ovarian function may be measured by gynecologic ultrasonography of follicular volume. Presently, ovarian follicle volumes can be measured rapidly and automatically from three-dimensionally reconstructed ultrasound images.

Rupture of the follicle can result in abdominal pain (mittelschmerz) and is to be considered in the differential diagnosis in women of childbearing age.

Cryopreservation and culture tissue after cryopreservation. Cryopreservation of ovarian tissue is of interest to women who want to preserve their reproductive function beyond the natural limit, or whose reproductive potential is threatened by cancer therapy, for example in hematologic malignancies or breast cancer.

For in vitro culture of follicles, there are various techniques to optimize the growth of follicles, including the use of defined media, growth factors and three-dimensional extracellular matrix support. Molecular methods and immunoassay can evaluate stage of maturation and guide adequate differentiation. Animal studies have generally shown correct imprinted DNA methylation establishment in oocytes resulting from follicle culture.

Additional images

See also 
Antral follicle

References

External links 
  - "The Female Pelvis: The Ovary"
 
 Images at okstate.edu
 Life cycle at gfmer.ch

Mammal female reproductive system